General elections were held in Oregon on November 2, 2010. Primary elections took place on May 18, 2010.

Federal

United States Senate

Democratic incumbent Ron Wyden ran for re-election. His Republican opponent was Jim Huffman.

United States House of Representatives

All five of Oregon's seats in the United States House of Representatives were up for re-election in 2010.  All five incumbents ran for re-election, including Democrat David Wu in District 1, Republican Greg Walden in District 2, Democrat Earl Blumenauer in District 3, Democrat Peter DeFazio in District 4, and Democrat Kurt Schrader in District 5.

State

Governor

Incumbent Governor Ted Kulongoski was term-limited. Former two-term governor John Kitzhaber, a Democrat, defeated the Republican nominee, former NBA player Chris Dudley.

Superintendent of Public Instruction
In May, incumbent Susan Castillo faced State Representative Ron Maurer for Superintendent of Public Instruction, a nonpartisan office. She received just over 50% of the vote, meaning that she was re-elected rather than facing a runoff in November.

Results

Treasurer
The 2010 elections in Oregon also included a special election for Treasurer to complete the term of Ben Westlund, who was elected in 2008 but died in office.  Interim Treasurer Ted Wheeler defeated State Senator Rick Metsger in the Democratic primary, and then defeated Republican State Senator Chris Telfer, who was unopposed in the Republican primary, in November.

Democratic primary results

General election results

State legislature

Sixteen of the 30 seats in the Oregon State Senate, and all 60 seats in the Oregon House of Representatives, were up for election in 2010.

Judicial Offices
Two seats on the Oregon Supreme Court, three seats on the Oregon Court of Appeals, and many Circuit Court Judges were up for election in 2010.
Oregon judicial elections, 2010 at Judgepedia

Ballot measures

January
Two measures, both veto referendums, appeared on the state's ballot in a January special election.

Measure 66
Raises tax on household income at and above $250,000 (and $125,000 for individual filers). Reduces income taxes on unemployment benefits in 2009. Provides funds currently budgeted for education, health care, public safety, other services.

Measure 67
Raises $10 corporate minimum tax, business minimum tax, corporate profits tax. Provides funds currently budgeted for education, health care, public safety, other services.

May
Two measures, both legislative referrals, appeared on the state's ballot in May 2010.

Measure 68
Revises constitution: Allows state to issue bonds to match voter approved school district bonds for school capital costs.

Measure 69
Amends constitution: continues and modernizes authority for lowest cost borrowing for community colleges and public universities.

November
Seven statewide measures appeared on the November ballot. Three were legislative referrals and four were citizen initiatives.

Measure 70

Amends Constitution: Expands availability of home ownership loans for Oregon veterans through Oregon War Veterans' Fund.

Measure 71

Amends Constitution: Requires legislature to meet annually; limits length of legislative sessions; provides exceptions.

Measure 72

Amends Constitution:  Authorizes exception to $50,000 state borrowing limit for state's real and personal property projects.

Measure 73

Requires increased minimum sentences for certain repeated sex crimes, incarceration for repeated driving under influence.

Measure 74

Establishes medical marijuana supply system and assistance and research programs; allows limited selling of marijuana.

Measure 75

Authorizes Multnomah County casino; casino to contribute monthly revenue percentage to state for specified purposes.

Measure 76

Amends Constitution: Continues lottery funding for parks, beaches, wildlife habitat, watershed protection beyond 2014; modifies funding process

See also
Oregon 2010 ballot measures at Ballotpedia

References

External links
Election history archives from the Oregon Secretary of State
Candidates for Oregon State Offices at Project Vote Smart
Oregon Polls at Pollster.com

Oregon Congressional Races in 2010 campaign finance data from OpenSecrets
Oregon 2010 campaign finance data from Follow the Money
Imagine Election - Find out which candidates will appear on your ballot.  Search by address or zip code.

 
Oregon
Oregon elections by year